Robert Heysham Sayre (October 13, 1824 – January 4, 1907) was vice president and chief engineer of the Lehigh Valley Railroad. He was also vice president and general manager of Bethlehem Iron Company, precursor of Bethlehem Steel Corporation. The borough of Sayre, Pennsylvania and the small city of Sayre, Oklahoma were named in his honor.

Early life
Sayre was born on October 13, 1824 to William Heysham Sayre and Elizabeth Kent, his wife, on the Kent family's farm near Bloomsburg in rural Columbia County, Pennsylvania. In 1828, the Sayre family moved to Mauch Chunk (now Jim Thorpe), Pennsylvania where William worked for the Lehigh Coal & Navigation Company as a lockmaster. As a result of observing the locks, young Robert showed an early interest in construction and civil engineering.

Career
Sayre's first significant work in engineering was on the Morris Canal in New Jersey. He also participated in the surveys and construction for the Mauch Chunk Switchback Railway.

In 1854, Sayre was named Chief Engineer of the Lehigh Valley Railroad, and he led the extension of that railroad northward and westward through Pennsylvania and New York State.

Sayre was one of the founders of Bethlehem Iron Company, precursor of Bethlehem Steel Corporation.  He was responsible for the design and construction of the company's first iron works during the years 1861 through 1863.  He became vice president of Bethlehem Iron Works in 1891.
 
Sayre built a large house in Bethlehem and lived in it from 1858 until his death in 1907.  Currently his house is known as the Sayre Mansion, and is in use as a bed-and-breakfast.

Philanthropy
Sayre was a trustee of St. Luke's Hospital and a Charter Trustee of Lehigh University.

Sayre Observatory at Lehigh University was erected in 1868 and was paid for by a gift of $5,000 from Sayre.

References

External links
Metz, Lance E. The Diaries of Robert Heysham Sayre. Bethlehem, PA: Lehigh University, 1990.

1824 births
1907 deaths
Bethlehem Steel people
Lehigh University people
Lehigh Valley Railroad people